"Planta" (Spanish for Plant) is a song of the Argentine rock band Soda Stereo, written and composed by Gustavo Cerati and Zeta Bosio. It was edited in their seventh and last studio album Sueño Stereo in 1995 as track 10. Part of the small progressive rock concept album that is included in the album.

Lyrics
The lyrics is written as a very metaphorical poem, and apparently talking on a hallucinogenic plant (drug). Never pronounced the word "", but the lyrics referred it with phrases like "", "".

Music
The song begins right at the end of the previous song, "Crema de Estrellas" ("Cream of Stars"), as they are non-stop musical unit.

The song is divided into two, with the first part without the drums (only cymbals), with a prominent participation of the bass guitar and a delicate guitar riff; and the second part with drums and a guitar rhythm that takes a leading role. At the end of the song begins immediately and without pause the next song "X-Playó" (instrumental).

Live performances
In the Sueño Stereo Tour during 1995-1996, Soda Stereo performed the song to open their concerts.

External links
 
 

Soda Stereo songs
1995 songs
Songs written by Gustavo Cerati
Songs written by Zeta Bosio
Songs about drugs
Songs about plants